Two ships of the Royal Navy have borne the name HMS Telemachus,  after Telemachus, a figure in Greek mythology, the son of Odysseus and Penelope, and a central character in Homer's Odyssey:

  was an  launched in 1917 and sold in 1927.
  was a T-class submarine launched in 1943 and scrapped in 1961.

In addition, the Royal Navy employed a hired armed cutter  between 1795 and 1801.

Royal Navy ship names